A69 Architects is an architecture studio in Prague-Braník, Czech Republic. It was founded in 1994 in Cheb by Boris Redčenkov and Prokop Tomášek as the association Atelier 69 – architects, since 2003 as A69 – architects. The studio is doing design work on one-family houses with characteristic features as well as urban planning.

History 
In 1994, Boris Redčenkov and Prokop Tomášek founded Atelier 69 – Architects. Later in 1997 Jaroslav Wertig became a partner to the Atelier. Today the atelier is known as A69 – architects s.r.o. The studio first started in Cheb.

Projects

On-going projects 
 Florenc Bus Station Competition (Prague)
In the spring of 2021, UNIT architects, A69 architects and the London studio Marko & Placemakers won the competition for the design of the bus station in Prague's surroundings and its surroundings. "The winning design won us over for its urban solution with a reasonable scale and the design of the connection between Těšnov and Žižkov with a new public space at the foot of Žižkov. In addition, it addresses the possibility of a future relocation of the main road in the Těšnov area, which gives the opportunity to create a new city park.
 Smíchov City Design (Prague)
The Smichov City design started in 2020 with the development of the first phase- the northern stage- which is building 15,000m2 of offices, restaurant, market, and shopping spaces, as well as apartments.

Past projects 
 Reconstruction of a family house (Stará Boleslav), 2020
 Extension of the Sanatorium Dr. Peták (Františkovy Lázně), 2006
 EggO House (Prague, Czech Republic), 2006
 Villa Lea (Slatina), 2005
 House – Plot (Cheb), 2004
 Sanitorium Dr. Peták (Františkovy Lázně), 2001

Awards 

'17 BigMat Home of Builders, International Architecture Award. The Prototype of the House in Posazavi.

References

External links 
 Sipral forms the facade for Masaryk according to the design of Zaha Hadid. The golden facade is still created in 3D

Czech companies established in 1994